The Mad Trapper is a 1972 British made-for-television docudrama film. The Mad Trapper is based on the 1931 Royal Canadian Mounted Police (RCMP) pursuit of a trapper named Albert Johnson, the reputed "Mad Trapper of Rat River".

A later film exploring the same topic was Challenge to Be Free (a.k.a.  Mad Trapper of the Yukon and Mad Trapper) (1975) directed by Tay Garnett and stars Mike Mazurki. A later fictionalized account, Death Hunt (1981), also based on the story of the  RCMP pursuit of  Albert Johnson, was directed by Peter R. Hunt, and starred Charles Bronson, Lee Marvin, Angie Dickinson and Carl Weathers.

Plot
In the Yukon, an American trapper (Del Henney) attempts to live in peace but is aware that other trappers resent his presence. When he is confronted by rival trappers, they bring along Millen (George R. Robertson), the local RCMP officer. Feeling intimidated, the trapper fights back, shooting his way out of his cabin, killing Millen and embarking on a desperate attempt to escape the authorities. The hazardous trek through the Arctic in the middle of winter becomes an epic manhunt, led by "Sarge" (Richard Alden). The RCMP eventually employ dog teams, radio and aircraft to bring down their prey.

Cast
 Richard Alden as "Sarge" 
 Joe Austin as Ernie
 Brandon Brady	as R.C.M.P. Carter
 Del Henney as The Mad Trapper
 Neil McCallum	as Eames
 Dan McDonald as King
 George R. Robertson as Millen

Production
The Mad Trapper was filmed mainly on location in the Yukon and Alaska, the same locales of the "Mad Trapper" manhunt.

Reception
Reviewer Leonard Maltin noted (The) Mad Trapper was made in 1972 and was based on the story of  "... a fur trapper pursued by the law in Arctic surroundings."

Notes

References

Bibliography

 Anderson, Frank W. and Art Downs. The Death of Albert Johnson, Mad Trapper of Rat River. Surrey, British Columbia, Canada: Heritage House, 1986. .
 Maltin, Leonard. Leonard Maltin's Movie Guide 2009. New York: New American Library, 2009 (originally published as TV Movies, then Leonard Maltin’s Movie & Video Guide), First edition 1969, published annually since 1988. .
 North, Dick. The Mad Trapper of Rat River: A True Story of Canada's Biggest Manhunt. Toronto, Ontario, Canada: Macmillan Company, 1972. .

External links
 

1972 television films
British television films
1970s adventure films
Northern (genre) films
Television films based on actual events
Films set in the 1930s
Canadian folklore
Royal Canadian Mounted Police in fiction
Films set in Yukon
1970s chase films
1970s English-language films